Kerry Jonker (born 21 May 1996) is a South African racing cyclist, who currently rides for UCI Women's Continental Team  and lives in Girona, Spain.

Before 2020 Jonker rode on an Australian license. In 2018 she won a bronze medal at the Australian National Time Trial Championships in the Women's Under 23 category. Jonker has also competed for Australia in triathlon.

She rode as a South-African in the women's time trial event at the 2020 UCI Road World Championships.  At the 2022 African Road Championships she won a bronze medal in the Individual Time Trials, and ended up in 8th place in the road race.

References

External links

1996 births
Living people
Australian female cyclists
South African female cyclists
Place of birth missing (living people)